Ablesh (also Romanized as Āblesh; also known as Ābāsh) is a former village in Tashan-e Sharqi Rural District, Tashan District, Behbahan County, Khuzestan Province, Iran. The former villages of Ablesh, Chahardahi-ye Sohrab, Chahardahi-ye Asgar, Deh-e Ebrahim, Masiri & Toll Kohneh came together to create the city of Tashan. At the 2006 census, its population was 718, in 152 families.

References 

Populated places in Behbahan County